Soren Emil Carlsen (October 19, 1853 – January 2, 1932, New York City, U.S.) was an American Impressionist painter who emigrated to the United States from Denmark. He became known for his still lifes. Later in his career, Carlsen expanded his range of subjects to include landscapes and seascapes as well.

During his long career, he won many of the most important honors in American art and was elected to membership in the National Academy of Design. For more than forty years he was also a respected teacher in Chicago, San Francisco and New York.

Early career

Emil Carlsen was born and raised in the Danish capital of Copenhagen. He came from an artistic family. His mother painted, and by some accounts, his cousin, who was an influence on him, later became the director of the Danish Royal Academy He studied architecture at the Royal Academy in Copenhagen for four years and then emigrated to the United States in 1872, settling in Chicago, United States.

Interested in art, he first worked as an architect's assistant and studied with the Danish marine artist Lauritz Holst. However, Holst returned to Denmark, leaving his studio to Carlsen. He made rapid progress and was appointed the first teacher of drawing and painting at the Chicago Academy of Design, Carlsen sought more training and embarked for Paris in 1875, where he came under the influence of the French still life painter Jean-Baptiste-Siméon Chardin. When he returned to the United States, he set up a studio in New York and began to painted tonalist still lifes that were somewhat reminiscent of those of Chardin. However, selling work was still a struggle. After moving to Boston he had a short period of good sales.

He returned to New York and again struggled to sell his paintings. In 1879 he held an auction to help ease his financial situation but ended up selling only a few paintings. This compelled him to give up his studio and take up engraving with which he found some success despite his frustration at not being able to paint full time. These often depicted copper pans, game, or flowers. The acceptance of a still life in the exhibition of the Pennsylvania Academy of Fine Arts in 1883 was the first noteworthy event in his career. In 1884 he returned to Europe, painting commissions of floral still lifes for the dealer, Theron J. Blakeslee, to support his studies. Eventually, he turned his back on the demand for pretty flowers. In 1885 Carlsen had two works accepted for the Paris Salon.

Returning to New York he opened a studio on 57th Street. However, finding that it was still difficult to sell paintings he moved to San Francisco where between 1887 and 1889 he held a position as director of the California School of Design. He became friends with Arthur Mathews, who taught at the School of Design and was the leading figure in the Bay Area Arts and Crafts Movement. He then moved on to teach privately at the San Francisco Art Students League until 1891. During those years he influenced a number of young students, among them were M. Evelyn McCormick and Guy Rose, who both became leading Giverny Impressionists. In 1891, just prior to his departure, Carlsen created a firestorm by openly declaring in one of San Francisco’s leading newspapers that art education was wasted on women who were inferior pupils without self-confidence and who were expected to become school teachers and marry. Arthur Mathews published a spirited rebuttal that provoked further debate.

Return to the east
Carlsen moved back to the east from California in 1891 and began a long career of teaching in the East. He taught at the National Academy of Design, at the student-founded Art Student's League, and the Pennsylvania Academy of Fine Arts. Gradually, through his relationship with other New York-based painters and teachers such as John Twachtman and Julian Alden Weir, he became interested in painting landscapes and marines. Carlsen sketched in Connecticut in the early 1900s, visiting his friend Julian Alden Weir in Branchville, Fairfield County, Connecticut. This became the famous "Weir Farm" where many American Impressionists painted landscape en plein-air.

The Carlsens and their young son Dines spent several summers living in a cottage on the farm. The artists would paint during the day and socialize in the evening. Carlsen purchased a home in Falls Village, Connecticut in 1905 and the Carlsen family spent most of their time there when Carlsen did not have teaching commitments in New York. Falls Village is in the Berkshire Foothills and Carlsen painted the rolling foothills and the forests of the Berkshire Mountains.

Success and respect

Although he was considered to be one of the most respected American painters, Carlsen struggled financially for the first several decades of his career. The Macbeth Gallery in New York was the first gallery that specialized in the work of American artists. After Carlsen joined the gallery, which represented many of the American Impressionism artists, his sales improved and for the first time he was able to live comfortably without constant financial stress. He had solo exhibitions at Macbeth in 1912, 1919 and 1921 and 1923.

He received the Samuel T. Shaw Purchase Prize at the National Academy of Design.

Teaching career
Emil Carlsen was a sought after teacher and financial necessity drove him to teach more than he wanted, taking time away from his painting. As he became more financially successful, he cut back on his teaching commitments. He taught the life class at the National Academy of Design from 1905 to 1909. He commuted from New York to Philadelphia to lecture at the Pennsylvania Academy of Fine Arts for many years. Among his pupils was the miniaturist Rosa Hooper.

Personal life
Emil Carlsen married Luela Mary Ruby in 1896 and the couple moved into his 59th Street studio, where they made their home for the remainder of their lives. They had a single child, Dines Carlsen in 1901 who was home schooled. His mother taught him scholastic subjects and his father instructed him in art. Dines Carlsen began his own exhibition career in 1914, exhibiting a still life at the National Academy of Design when he was thirteen. Dines Carlsen was made an Associate National Academician in 1922, when he was 21, and a full Academician in 1942. Dines Carlsen exhibited alongside his father at the Grand Central Galleries in New York. He had three solo exhibitions at that gallery. After Dines Carlsen died in 1966, Grand Central Galleries held a dual retrospective exhibition to honor both artists. Carlsen was close friends with Julian Alden Weir, John Twachtman and Childe Hassam.

Artistic philosophy
In 1908, Carlsen published an article on still life painting for the now obscure art journal Palette and Bench where he wrote of the low status of still lifes:

... still life painting is considered of small importance in the Art schools, both here and abroad, the usual course being drawn from the antique, the nude, and painting the draped figure and from the nude. ... Then why should the earnest student overlook the simplest and most thorough way of acquiring all the knowledge of the craft of painting and drawing, the study of inanimate objects, still life painting, the very surest road to absolute mastery over all technical difficulties.

Critical responses
Professor William Gerdts wrote extensively of Carlsen and his aesthetic sensibility in his book on American still life painting "Painters of the Humble Truth" and he describes the objects in the paintings as

... often lacking in traditional beauty, What makes the paintings beautiful is Carlsen's sensitivity in arrangement - large shapes are juxtaposed with small flat forms and tall ones, their outlines are often united in refined harmonious curves. and are placed backward and forward on their limited support surface to allow for "breathing room," for slow movement in space.

The art historian Richard Boyle also noted Carlsen's craftsmanship, in his book American Impressionism, states:

Carlesen's special concern was still life, and his paintings are beautifully crafted and delicate of surface, reminiscent of Whistler and especially Dewing. Carlsen was concerned with "ideal beauty" as well as the beauty inherent in the subject, in texture and color; as in Dewing's works, the placement of the objects on his canvas is extremely important ...

The art writer Arthur Edwin Bye featured Carlsen most prominently in his survey of American Still life painting in 1921 and wrote of him:

Emil Carlsen is unquestionably the most accomplished master of still-life painting in America today. ... It is evident that Carlsen has lifted his art to a height it has never reached before."

In American Impressionism, William Gerdts wrote about Carlsen's transition from still life artist to landscape painter:

Carlsen was attracted to the beauties of the rolling hills and interpreted them in soft, pastel tones. Carlsen's landscape mode, however, is more completely of this century, and it developed in the more decorative, somewhat naturalistic manner that characterized later Impressionism.

The art collector Duncan Phillips wrote of Carlsen that his ocean scenes had "a certain trance-like mood."

Students

Frederick Becker
Mary Brady
Edith Maurice Bregy
Anne Bremer
Claude Buck
Elbridge Ayer Burbank
Jay Hall Connaway
Katherine Langdon Corson
Edwin Deakin
Anna Parker Dixwell
Margaret Anna Dobson
Maren Froelich
Wilhelmina Weber Furlong
Alice Hapgood Hathaway Goodwin Earle
John M. Gamble
Percy Gray
Charles W. Hargens Jr.
Abraham Harriton
Margaret Cox Herrick
Isabel Hunter
Helen Hyde
Elsa Laubach Jemne
Helen Elizabeth Keep
William Keith
Andrew Loomis
Louis Lozowick
Ethel Marcy
Marie Evelyn McCormick
Jane Roma McElroy
Lola Sleeth Miller
Charlotte Bodwell Morgan
Mary DeNeale Morgan
Benjamin Franklin Norris Jr.
Eric Pape
Ernest Clifford Peixotto
Hugo Robus
Guy Rose
Geneve Rixford Sargeant
Carl Schmitt
Harry Seawell
James Guilford Swinnerton
Jesse Bryon Trefethen
Gustave Verbeek

Memberships
The National Academy of Design, New York
The Bohemian Club, San Francisco, California
Salmagundi Club, New York, New York

Awards
De Neuhausenske Præmier, 1869
Gold Medal, Louisiana Purchase Exposition, St. Louis, 1904
Shaw Prize, National Academy of Design
Medal of Honor, Panama–Pacific International Exposition, San Francisco, California, 1915

Museum collections
Art Institute of Chicago, Chicago, Illinois
The Dayton Art Institute, Dayton, Ohio ("Iron Kettle with Onions" c. 1925)
Akron Art Museum, Akron, OH ("Rhages Jar" date unknown)
De Young Museum, San Francisco, California
Bohemian Club, San Francisco, California
National Museum of American Art, Smithsonian Institution, Washington, D.C.
Metropolitan Museum of Art, New York, New York
Chicago Historical Society, Chicago, Illinois
Brooklyn Museum of Art, Brooklyn New York
Montclair Art Museum, Montclair, New Jersey 
Pennsylvania Academy of Fine Art, Philadelphia, Pennsylvania
Oakland Museum of California, Oakland, California
Santa Barbara Museum of Art, Santa Barbara, California;
Frye Art Museum, Seattle, Washington
San Diego Museum of Art, San Diego, California
Butler Art Institute, Youngstown, Ohio ("The Surf" 1907)
Columbus Museum, Columbus, Georgia
Bruce Museum, Greenwich, Connecticut
El Paso Museum of Art, El Paso, Texas

See also

American Impressionism
Tonal Impressionism
California Tonalism
French Impressionism
Tonalism

Notes

References

Arthur Edwin Bye, Pots and Pans or Studies in Still Life Painting (Princeton: Princeton University Press, 1921), 213-214.
Connecticut and American Impressionism, Exhibition Catalog, p. 154-155, University of Connecticut, Storrs, Connecticut, 1980
American Elite and Sociologist Bluebook. p. 387. American Blue Book Publishers, 1922.
The Art of Emil Carlsen, 1853–1932, Exhibition Catalog, Wortsman Rowe Art Galleries, San Francisco, California, 1975
Jeffrey Morseburg, Emil Carlsen.Com, Web Site, Biography and Essays, 2004
Duncan Phillips, "Emil Carlsen", International Studio 61 (June 1917)
"Soren Emil Carlsen", American Art from the Dickie Collection, Dayton Art Institute, 1997, p. 40-41
Arthur Edwin Bye, Pots and Pans or Studies in Still Life Painting (Princeton: Princeton University Press, 1921), 213-214.
William H. Gerdts, Painters of the Humble Truth: Masterpieces of American Still Life, 1801-1939 (Columbia, Miss.: University of Missouri Press, 1981), 22.
Ulrich W. Hiesinger, Quiet Magic: The Still-Life Paintings of Emil Carlsen (New York: Vance Jordan Fine Art, 1999).
Emil Carlsen (October 1908). "On Still-Life Painting". Palette and Bench: 6–8.
Selected Works from the Dayton Art Institute Permanent Collection, Emil Carlsen, (Dayton, Ohio, Dayton Art Institute, 1999) p. 82
Gertrude Still, Emil Carlsen, Lyrical Impressionist
William H. Gerdts, American Impressionism, Cross River Press, 1984
Abby Taylor, Emil Carlsen, AskArt Web Site, 2010
Carol Lowrey, A Legacy of Art: Paintings and Sculpture by Members of the National Arts Club, p. 68-69

External links
Emil Carlsen Archives 
Emil Carlsen
National Academy of Design
Weir Farm National Historic Site (Where Carlsen, Weir and Twachtman painted)
Connecticut Art Trail - Locations Related to American Impressionism
"The American Impressionists". Time. March 26, 1956.
Several Carlsen exhibition catalogs from The Metropolitan Museum of Art Libraries (fully available online as PDF)

1853 births
1932 deaths
19th-century American painters
American male painters
20th-century American painters
American Impressionist painters
American landscape painters
Painters from New York City
Danish emigrants to the United States
Artists from Copenhagen
American still life painters
Pennsylvania Academy of the Fine Arts faculty
19th-century American male artists
20th-century American male artists
Members of the American Academy of Arts and Letters